Satish Vegesna is an Indian film director and screenwriter known for his works in Telugu cinema. His filmSathamanam Bhavati received the National Film Award for Best Popular Film Providing Wholesome Entertainment and the state Nandi Awards for Best Direction, and Best Home Viewing Feature Film.

Early life 
Vegesna was born in Tanuku of West Godavari district, Andhra Pradesh. He completed his BA and worked as a composer in the news daily Eenadu for 7 years. He quit his job to become a writer.

Filmography 

Vegesna initially worked as a writer and became a director. In 1999, he started working with director Muppalaneni Shiva for a few films like Speed Dancer, Priya O Priya. He worked with E. V. V. Satyanarayana for the film Thotti Gang. This along with Kabaddi Kabaddi gave him a break as a writer. Later he worked with Allari Naresh for several films.

Dongala Bandi was his first film as a director starring Allari Naresh. But this film did not do well at the box office. He worked for director Harish Shankar for the films Gabbar Singh, Ramayya Vastavayya, and Subrahmanyam for Sale. After that he approached producer Dil Raju with the story of Sathamanam Bhavati which became a hit at the box office also garnering a National award and state Nandi award. The film received the National Film Award for Best Popular Film Providing Wholesome Entertainment for "in appreciation of providing a feeling of jubilation by respecting family values in an unexplored manner".

As a director 
 Dongala Bandi (2008)
 Raamadandu (2012)
 Kulumanali (2012)
 Sathamanam Bhavati (2017)
 Srinivasa Kalyanam (2018)
 Entha Manchivaadavuraa (2020)
 Kothi Kommachhi (2021)
  Sri Sri Sri Rajaavaaru(2022)

As a writer

References 

Nandi Award winners
Indian male screenwriters
20th-century Indian film directors
Film directors from Andhra Pradesh
Screenwriters from Andhra Pradesh
21st-century Indian film directors
Telugu film directors
Telugu screenwriters
Living people
Directors who won the Best Popular Film Providing Wholesome Entertainment National Film Award
Year of birth missing (living people)
People from Andhra Pradesh
People from West Godavari district
Film people from Andhra Pradesh